Vidyasagar School of Social Work,  is a college in Salt Lake, Bidhannagar,  Kolkata. It offers undergraduate and postgraduate courses in social work. It is affiliated to  Vidyasagar University.

Courses

Bachelor in Social Work
Masters in Social Work
PG Diploma in Psycho Counseling

See also

References

External links
 http://jpinstitute.org/vssw/

Universities and colleges in Kolkata
Colleges affiliated to Vidyasagar University
1995 establishments in West Bengal
Educational institutions established in 1995